Mary Riddell (born 1980) is an American Paralympic alpine skier. In 2017, she was inducted in the U.S. Disabled Snow Sports Hall of Fame.

She represented the United States in para-alpine skiing at the 1998 Winter Paralympics in Nagano and 2002 Winter Paralympics in Salt Lake City. She won six medals including two gold, two silver and two bronzes.

Career 
Riddell won the gold medal in the LW3,4,5 / 7,6 giant slalom competition, with a time of 2:41.35, better than opponents Karolina Wisniewska (2: 41.82) and Ramona Hoh (2: 42.06), at the 1998 Nagano Winter Paralympics.  In the LW3,4,6 / 8 downhill event, she finished second in 1: 15.00, behind her compatriot Jennifer Kelchner in 1: 14.97.  She won two bronze medals in the slalom (achieved time 2: 04.17), and super-G LW3,4,5 / 7,6 / 8 (in 1: 05.80).

At the 2002 Paralympic Winter Games in Salt Lake City, Riddell won the gold medal in the giant slalom LW3,4,9 (silver medal for Karolina Wisniewska and bronze for Lauren Woolstencroft),  and silver in the alpine super combined LW3,4,6 / 8,9 (in 1st place Woolstencroft and in 3rd place Wisniewska). She placed in 4th place in the downhill category LW3,4,6 / 8,9; while on the podium were Rachael Battersby in 1: 30.63, Csilla Kristof in 1: 31.41 and Karolina Wisniewska in 1: 32.19.

She finished second in giant slalom at the 2000 Hartford Ski Spectacular, behind Sarah Will.

References

External links 

 Mary Riddell – 2017 U.S. Disabled Snow Sports Hall of Fame Inductee, Move United. December 20, 2017

1980 births
Living people
People from Dolores County, Colorado
Paralympic alpine skiers of the United States
American female alpine skiers
Alpine skiers at the 1998 Winter Paralympics
Alpine skiers at the 2002 Winter Paralympics
Medalists at the 1998 Winter Paralympics
Medalists at the 2002 Winter Paralympics
Paralympic gold medalists for the United States
Paralympic silver medalists for the United States
Paralympic bronze medalists for the United States